Junior Roundup is a Canadian children's television series which aired on CBC Television from 1960 to 1961.

Premise
This series consisted of segments on a variety of topics. The first quarter-hour, Bantam Roundup, was geared towards the youngest schoolchildren as it rebroadcast episodes of other CBC children's shows. The remaining three-quarters of the episode consisted of programming for older children, including performance segments, game and quiz segments and rebroadcasts of other series.

Scheduling
This hour-long series was broadcast weekdays at 4:30 p.m. (Eastern) from 17 October 1960 to 3 July 1961.

Episodes followed this daily format until May 1961:

In the final two months of the series, Westgate appeared less often (seen only on the Monday and Wednesday episodes). Newer features were introduced, particularly on Thursdays and Fridays, including episodes of Caravan. Doug Davidson continued to produce episodes except on Mondays (when Bill Davidson took over) and on Fridays. Segments hosted by Broadfoot, Templeton and Westgate were videotaped on location at summer camps.

References

External links
 
 

CBC Television original programming
1960 Canadian television series debuts
1961 Canadian television series endings